Government College (Autonomous) Angul is an educational institute set up by the government of Odisha, India, in 1957 at Angul (district headquarters) and was inaugurated by the Chief Minister of Odisha, Dr. Harekrishna Mahatab. It is situated at the heart of Angul, nearly a kilometer away from NH-55 and railway station is just .

History
The university started as an intermediate college and its name has undergone several changes. It assumed the name Government College, Angul in 1976. The college is affiliated to the Utkal University. It became a lead college in the year 1990.

The autonomous status was conferred on the college by the University Grants Commission during the session 2006–07 and the college has been accredited by the National Assessment and Accreditation Council.

Department
 Mathematics
 Botany
 Chemistry
 Commerce
 Computer Science
 Economics
 Education
 English
 Geography
 History
 Odia
 Philosophy
 Physics
 Political Science
 Sanskrit
 Zoology

Hostel
The college provides accommodation facilities for students. There are three boy's hostels and two women's hostels for 400 students, and the principal appoints a superintendent for managing the hostels.

References

External links

Department of Higher Education, Odisha
Autonomous Colleges of Odisha
Universities and colleges in Odisha
Angul district
Educational institutions established in 1957
1957 establishments in Orissa